The Bayard–Condict Building at 65 Bleecker Street between Broadway and Lafayette Street, at the head of Crosby Street in the NoHo neighborhood of Manhattan, New York City is the only work of architect Louis Sullivan in New York City. It was built between 1897 and 1899 in the Chicago School style; the associate architect was Lyndon P. Smith. The building was originally known as the Condict Building before being renamed the Bayard Building.  The building was considered to be a radical design for its time, since it contravened the strictures of American Renaissance architecture which were the accepted status quo, but had little influence on architectural design in New York City, because of its location in the industrial area that Bleecker Street was during that period. It is located in the NoHo Historic District.

The building was designated a New York City landmark in 1975, and has been a National Historic Landmark since 1976.

Design
This commercial office building is clad in white glazed terracotta over a masonry wall. The Bayard Building was one of the first skeleton frame skyscrapers in New York City, and the Department of Buildings raised numerous objections to the design before the plans were finally accepted. It is one of the first examples of the Chicago school style of architecture in New York City.

The division of the building into three sections – an ornamented base, a shaft of identical stacked floors, and a decorated crown – illustrates Sullivan's views on skyscraper design. Sullivan's signature ornate floral designs decorate the base and top of the facade, and across the spandrels below the window openings. Figural sculptures of angels were added at the request of the client, Silas Alden Condict, over Sullivan's objections.

Restoration
In 2000, WASA/Studio A, a New York City-based architecture and engineering firm, designed and oversaw the careful restoration of the exterior of the Bayard–Condict Building.  Of the 7,000 glazed architectural terra-cotta tile units, 1,300 were found to be cracked and required removal.  Of these, only 30 units were damaged beyond repair and were replicated.  The remainder were epoxied and blind pinned, and then reinstalled.  At some point in the building's history, the original storefronts were replaced with generic commercial aluminum storefronts.  This renovation removed the extravagantly ornate original column capitals; only one survived in the basement of the Brooklyn Museum.  When the storefronts were restored by others, WASA/Studio A had the column capitals replicated based on the surviving original and reinstalled.  In 2003, the Greenwich Village Society for Historic Preservation recognized the restoration's excellence with a Village Award.

Gallery

See also

Louis Sullivan buildings
Chicago school (architecture)
Chicago School: category index

References
Notes

External links

 "Bayard–Condict Building" at in-Arch Net
 "Bayard–Condict Building" at New York Architecture
 "Romantic Symbols: Sullivan in New York" at Columbia University's NYC Architecture site

Art Nouveau architecture in New York City
Art Nouveau commercial buildings
Buildings and structures completed in 1899
Buildings and structures on the National Register of Historic Places in Manhattan
Chicago school architecture in New York (state)
Historic American Buildings Survey in New York City
Louis Sullivan buildings
National Historic Landmarks in Manhattan
New York City Designated Landmarks in Manhattan
Skyscraper office buildings in Manhattan